was a Japanese classical and film music composer.

Early life 
Urato Watanabe was born on March 2, 1909, in Aomori, Japan, his family moved to Tokyo when he was two years old. He studied music at the Tokyo University of the Arts and graduating in 1929. In 1955, Watanabe traveled to Europe for the first time to participate in the International Folk Music Conference in Oslo, Norway.

Works

Film scores 

 Shirayuki-sensei to kodomo-tachi (1950)
Song of Love (1951)
 Elegy (1951)
 Bird Hyakusho (1951) - Vocials
The Second Son (1955)
 Migratory Birds of the Flowers (1956)
 A Man in the Storm (1957)
 Suzunosuke Akado (1957)
 Nikutai no hankō (1957)
 Suzunosuke Akado: The Moonlight Monster (1957)
 Suzunosuke Akado: Defeat the Demon-Faced Gang (1957)
 Suzunosuke Akado: The Vacuum Slash of Asuka (1957)
 Suzunosuke Akado: The Demon of Shingetsu Tower (1957)
Onibi Kago (1957)
 Demonfire Palanquin (1957)
 Suzunosuke Akado: The One-Legged Demon (1957)
 Suzunosuke Akado: The Birdman with Three Eyes (1958)
 Suzunosuke Akado: The Thunder Man of Kurokumo Valley (1958)
 Suzunosuke Akado: Defeat the Skull Gang (1958)
 Maboroshi Tantei: Chiteijin Shūrai (1960)
 Doggie March (1963)
 Human Bones (1978)

Television 

 Osomatsu-kun (1966) -  Soundtrack writer
 Judgment (1962)

References

External links 

 
 

1909 births
1994 deaths
20th-century classical composers
20th-century Japanese composers
20th-century Japanese male musicians
Japanese classical composers
Japanese film score composers
Japanese male classical composers
Japanese male film score composers
Japanese music educators
People from Aomori (city)